Jessica Camara (born 18 April 1988) is a Canadian professional boxer who challenged for the WBA, WBO, and IBO female light welterweight titles in November 2021.

Professional career 
Camara made her professional debut on 30 March 2017, scoring a four-round unanimous decision (UD) victory against Heidy Martinez at the Montreal Casino in Canada.

After compiling a record of 7–1, she faced Melissa St. Vil for the vacant WBO-NABO female lightweight title on 8 February 2021 at the Civic Center in Hammond, Indiana. Camara lost via ten-round UD with two judges scoring the bout 96–94 and the third scoring it 97–93.

After an eight-round UD victory against Heather Hardy in May 2021, she faced reigning champion Kali Reis for the WBA, IBO, and vacant WBO female light welterweight titles on 19 November at the SNHU Arena in Manchester, New Hampshire. In her first attempt at a world championship, Camara suffered the third defeat of her career, losing via ten-round split decision (SD) with one judge scoring the bout 96–94 in favour of Camara while the other two scored it 97–93 for Reis.

Professional boxing record

References 

Living people
1988 births
Canadian women boxers
Sportspeople from Cambridge, Ontario
Lightweight boxers
Light-welterweight boxers